Roy Orbison – Live from Australia is a 1972 performance by American Rock and Roll Hall of Fame legend Roy Orbison from Festival Hall in Melbourne, Australia. In it, Orbison performs the Neil Diamond hit "Sweet Caroline" and Simon & Garfunkel's "Bridge over Troubled Water" plus thirteen of his classic songs backed up by a full orchestra.

It was  released in DVD format on April 5, 2005 with addition family films (special features) under the supervision of Barbara Orbison. The black and white music portion (actual concert) has been broadcast in the United States on the PBS television network.

Running time: 90 minutes

Track listing
"Only the Lonely"
"Crying"
"Dream Baby"
"In Dreams"
"Mean Woman Blues"
"Too Soon To Know"
"Penny Arcade"
"Blue Bayou"
"Land of a Thousand Dances"
"Bridge Over Troubled Water"
"Leah" with encore
"Running Scared"
"Sweet Caroline" 
"It's Over"
"Oh, Pretty Woman" with encore
Recorded: October 3, 1972
 Roy Orbison - vocals, guitar,
 Billy Dean - guitar, vocals
 Alan James - guitar
 Terry Widlake - bass guitar
 Alan Mayes - trumpet
 Bob Munday - drums
 Gordon Balsmouth - piano

Roy Orbison video albums